Stephen John Poulter (born 9 September 1956) is a former English cricketer. Poulter was a right-handed batsman. He was born in Hornsey, Middlesex.

Poulter made his first-class debut for Middlesex against Nottinghamshire in 1978 County Championship. He played 2 further first-class matches that season, against Yorkshire and Derbyshire. In his 3 first-class matches, he scored 47 runs at a batting average of 15.66, with a highest score of 36. It was also in 1978 that he made his List A debut for Middlesex, making 2 appearances against Yorkshire and Sussex in the 1978 John Player League. In these 2 matches, he scored 15 runs at an average of 7.50, with a highest score of 13. He played Second XI cricket for Middlesex the following season, but after that his services were not retained.

Poulter later represented Buckinghamshire in a single Minor Counties Championship match against Devon in 1984.

References

External links
Stephen Poulter at ESPNcricinfo
Stephen Poulter at CricketArchive

1956 births
Living people
People from Hornsey
English cricketers
Middlesex cricketers
Buckinghamshire cricketers